Glenn Burgess (born 17 November 1963) is an Australian former professional rugby league footballer who played in the 1980s.

Playing career
Burgess was graded by the St George Dragons from their local juniors in the early 1980s. He went on to play five seasons of first grade with the Dragons between 1983 and 1987, which included playing fullback in the 1985 Grand Final.   

Burgess was a talented player and was known for his expertise at catching towering high balls from opposition kickers. He played 61 first grade games for the Dragons before finishing his career at the Gold Coast.

References

St. George Dragons players
Gold Coast Chargers players
Australian rugby league players
Living people
1963 births
Rugby league fullbacks
Rugby league players from Sydney